Chadda is a surname. Notable people with the surname include:

Mohit Chadda (fl. 2003–), Indian actor
Richa Chadda (born 1986), Indian actress
Rohit Chadda (born 1982), Indian businessman
 Shyam Chadda, (1920–1951) actor

Hindustani-language surnames
Surnames of Hindustani origin